Shane Harper (born February 1, 1989) is an American professional ice hockey player who is currently playing with the Adirondack Thunder of the ECHL.

Playing career
Shane Harper grew up playing hockey in the greater Los Angeles area. As a youth, he played in the 2002 Quebec International Pee-Wee Hockey Tournament with the Anaheim Junior Ducks minor ice hockey team.

Prior to turning professional, Harper played major junior hockey in the Western Hockey League with the Everett Silvertips where he was named to the Western Conference Second All-Star Team for his outstanding play during the 2009–10 WHL season.

On March 4, 2010, the Philadelphia Flyers signed Harper to a three-year, entry-level contract.

On June 12, 2013, he was traded from the Flyers to the New York Islanders, along with a 2014 4th-round draft pick, for the rights to defenseman Mark Streit.

Harper was not tendered a new contract with the Islanders and on September 9, 2013, he was signed as a free agent to a one-year contract with the Chicago Wolves of the AHL. In the 2014–15 season with the Wolves, Harper enjoyed a breakout season offensively, placing third in the League with 32 goals, for 50 points in 75 games.

On July 1, 2015, Harper secured an NHL contract in signing a one-year, two-way contract as a free agent with the Florida Panthers.

In the summer of 2016, Harper was part of the 2016 Navy Molson championship team. Capturing the elusive first title in franchise history.

Coming out of training camp in 2016, Harper made the Panthers initial 23-man roster. Harper made his NHL debut in a season opener against the New Jersey Devils. On October 22, 2016, Harper scored his first goal in the NHL and later would add another, a game-winner for the Panthers, against the Colorado Avalanche. Having appeared in 14 games with the Panthers for 3 points, Harper was reassigned to new AHL affiliate, the Springfield Thunderbirds. He collected 19 points in 39 games before on March 1, 2017, he was traded by the Panthers to the New Jersey Devils in exchange for Reece Scarlett.

As a free agent from the Devils, Harper was unable to earn another NHL contract over the summer. On October 2, 2017, he belatedly signed his first contract abroad, agreeing to a one-year deal with HC Lada Togliatti of the Kontinental Hockey League (KHL). In 36 games over the 2017–18 season, Harper contributed with just 4 goals and 11 points in a checking-line role.

In the off-season, Harper left Russia in agreeing to a two-year contract with Swedish club, Örebro HK of the Swedish Hockey League (SHL), on June 21, 2018.

Following three seasons in the SHL, Harper returned to North America as a free agent, agreeing to a one-year ECHL contract with the Adirondack Thunder on July 9, 2021. As an alternate captain with the Thunder, Harper posted 22 goals and 52 points in just 48 regular season games, however was unable to help propel the Thunder to the playoffs. At the conclusion of the regular season with Adirondack, Harper was signed to a professional try-out contract with AHL affiliate, the Utica Comets, on April 29, 2022.

Career statistics

Awards and honors

References

External links
 
Shane Harper's profile at HockeysFuture.com

1989 births
Living people
Adirondack Phantoms players
Adirondack Thunder players
Albany Devils players
American men's ice hockey left wingers
Brynäs IF players
Chicago Wolves players
Everett Silvertips players
Florida Panthers players
Greenville Road Warriors players
Ice hockey players from California
HC Lada Togliatti players
Örebro HK players
Portland Pirates players
Sportspeople from Santa Clarita, California
Springfield Thunderbirds players
Trenton Titans players
Undrafted National Hockey League players
Utica Comets players
People from Valencia, Santa Clarita, California